Jewelry Box is the second studio album and first Japanese release by the South-Korean girl group T-ara. The album was a commercial success peaking at 2  on the official Oricon weekly albums and receiving a Gold certification from RIAJ. A tour was held starting from July 2012 to promote the album which attracted over 40,000 spectatators.

Release and promotion
The album was announced on March 6, 2012, with a June release date, along with the announcement of their live Japanese tour T-ara Japan Tour 2012: Jewelry Box. Jewelry Box was released in three types: Diamond, Sapphire, and Pearl. Diamond features a special jewelry box-style packaging, while the Sapphire edition comes in a digipak and the Pearl edition comes in a regular jewel case. Both the Diamond and Sapphire editions come with a 100-page and 32-page photo book, respectively. All three editions of the album contain a random trading card of 8 types.

Commercial performance

Jewelry Box debuted at number two on the Oricon Albums Chart, with first-week sales of 57,102 in Japan. In its second week, the album dropped to number seven and sold 14,276 copies. The album spent its third and fourth weeks in the top twenty, and fell into the top thirty in its fifth week. The album ranked at number six on the Oricon Monthly Albums Chart, selling 86,530 copies. After a month of sales, it was certified Gold by the Recording Industry Association of Japan for shipments of over 100,000 copies.

Singles
Four singles have been released prior to the album, with the last released two weeks before the release of Jewelry Box. The group's debut Japanese single, "Bo Peep Bo Peep", was released on September 28, 2011. The music video for the song premiered four weeks prior to the release of the single on September 1, 2011, on the Japanese cable television network Space Shower TV. The single debuted at number one on Oricon's Weekly Singles chart with 49,712 copies sold, breaking records and making them the first Korean girl group to debut at the number one position. The song has also reached number one on the Billboard Japan Hot 100.

"Yayaya" was announced on October 14, 2011, and was released on November 30, 2011. The single had high expectations because of "Bo Peep Bo Peep" debuting at number one, but instead the single debuted at number seven on Oricon's Weekly Singles chart with 31,801 copies sold. Peaking at number six on Billboard Japan Hot 100 as well, it is T-ara's lowest charting Japanese single thus far. At the time, the group was busy in both Korea and Japan, promoting their third Korean extended play Black Eyes and "Yayaya" simultaneously.

"Roly-Poly" was released on February 29, 2012, with the music video premiering a month earlier on January 20. After Japanese fans asked if there will be no promotional activities for "Roly-Poly", as the Korean version of the song was included as the b-side for their last single, "Yayaya", T-ara's Korean agency Core Contents Media announced that "It isn't definite that we do not plan to have activities for "Roly-Poly" in Japan, we only added in the Korean version as a b-side for now. We have still only in the early stages and have yet to pick out a song that will come after "Yayaya"." However, a promo flyer for T-ara's third single being "Roly-Poly" was uploaded to the internet on December 20, with their official Japanese website confirming the single on the same day. A music video for one of the b-sides, the Japanese version of "Geojitmal" titled "Kojinmaru～Uso～", was also produced. "Roly-Poly" debuted at number three on Oricon's Weekly Singles chart, selling 41,285 copies, and peaking at number five on the Billboard Japan Hot 100.

"Lovey-Dovey", the fourth and final single for Jewelry Box, was released on May 23, 2012.

Concert tour

Overview 
The T-ara Japan Tour 2012: Jewelry Box (stylized as T-ARA JAPAN TOUR 2012～Jewelry Box～) was the group's first nationwide concert tour in Japan, in support of their first Japanese studio album, Jewelry Box. The tour began on June 19, 2012, at the Aichi Prefectural Arts Theater in Nagoya, Japan and ended on July 26 at the Nippon Budokan in Tokyo, Japan.

Setlists

Tour dates

Track listing

Charts and sales

Charts

Certifications and sales

Awards and nominations

References

2012 albums
T-ara albums
Stone Music Entertainment albums
Japanese-language albums
EMI Records albums